KOIA (88.1 FM) is a radio station licensed to serve the community of Storm Lake, Iowa. The station is owned by Saint Gabriel Communications, Ltd, and airs a Catholic radio format.

The station was assigned the KOIA call letters by the Federal Communications Commission on February 6, 2009.

References

External links
 Official Website
 

Radio stations established in 2012
2012 establishments in Iowa
OIA
Buena Vista County, Iowa